

Notable alumni
Notable alumni of Muhlenberg College in Allentown, Pennsylvania:

Academia
George O. Bierkoe, president and co-founder of Endicott College
Mahlon Hellerich, historian
Amy B. Jordan, Professor and Chair of Journalism and Media Studies at Rutgers University
Sidney Milkis, White Burkett Miller Professor of Politics at the University of Virginia
Herbert Needleman, professor of pediatrics and child psychology at the University of Pittsburgh School of Medicine
Leonard I. Zon, Grousbeck Professor of Pediatric Medicine at Harvard Medical School, investigator at Howard Hughes Medical Institute, and director of the Stem Cell program at Boston Children's Hospital

Arts
Brett Bara, writer, designer, television personality, spokesperson and consultant in the craft and DIY (do-it-yourself) community
Frederick Busch, author
Andrea Clearfield, composer
Madison Ferris, actress
Frankie Grande, dancer, singer, actor, producer, TV host, and YouTube personality
 Sarah Lampert - Creator of the Netflix series, Ginny & Georgia
Jack McCallum, author and sportswriter
Michael McDonald, costume designer and 2009 Tony Award and Drama Desk nominee for Hair
Darryl Ponicsan, novelist and screenwriter
Juliette Reilly, singer/songwriter
Brian Teta, executive producer, The View and supervising producer, Late Show with David Letterman
Theodore Weiss, poet

Business
Michael Pocalyko, business executive and novelist
Sam Calagione, Dogfish Head Brewery co-founder

Government and law
Richard Ben-Veniste, attorney, lead prosecutor in the Watergate case and Democratic counsel in the Whitewater hearings, member of the 9/11 Commission
Edward H. Bonekemper, former federal government attorney; military historian, author and lecturer
Marcus C. L. Kline, former U.S. Representative for Pennsylvania's 13th congressional district
Fred Ewing Lewis, former U.S. Representative
Edwin W. Martin Jr., Assistant Secretary of U.S. Department of Education, Special Education and Related Services. 1979-80; Associate and Deputy Commissioner 1969-1979. Director US House of. Representatives Subcommittee on the Handicapped, 1966–67
Michael Schlossberg, member of the Pennsylvania House of Representatives
John O. Sheatz (did not graduate), Pennsylvania state representative, state senator, and state treasurer (1908–11)
Lee Solomon, Justice of the Supreme Court of New Jersey
Kōtarō Tanaka, Japanese Jurist and last Minister of Education of the Empire of Japan
John Van Sant, Pennsylvania State Representative and State Senator from 1951-1970.

Journalism
Russ Choma, reporter and investigative journalist
Barbara Crossette, journalist and author, former chief correspondent for Southeast Asia and South Asia and United Nations bureau chief at The New York Times, United Nations correspondent for The Nation, member of the Council on Foreign Relations, and a trustee of the Carnegie Council on Ethics in International Affairs
David Fricke, senior editor, Rolling Stone

Musicians
Jack O'Brien, jazz musician

Religion and theology
Frank Buchman, founder of the Oxford Group, a Christian movement that rose to prominence in Europe and the U.S. in the 1920s and 1930s
Matthias Loy, Lutheran theologian
Theodore Emanuel Schmauk, Lutheran minister, theologian, educator and author

Science and medicine
Henry David Abraham, co-recipient of the Nobel Peace Prize in 1985 for his work with International Physicians for the Prevention of Nuclear War
Frank Baldino Jr., scientist and co-founder of Cephalon
Kenneth N. Beers, NASA flight surgeon
Lois Curfman McInnes, applied mathematician
Herbert Needleman, pediatrician known for research into lead poisoning
Leonard I. Zon, Grousbeck Professor of Pediatric Medicine at Harvard Medical School, Investigator at Howard Hughes Medical Institute, and Director of the Stem Cell Program at Boston Children's Hospital

Sports
Sisto Averno, former professional football player, Baltimore Colts (AAFC), New York Yanks, Dallas Texans, Baltimore Colts (NFL)
Jake Bornheimer, former professional basketball player, Philadelphia Warriors
Harry Donovan, professional basketball player with the New York Knicks
Bill Kern, former professional baseball player, Kansas City Athletics
Tim Murray, Host at VSiN. Former Muhlenberg men's basketball team member 
Tony Zuzzio, former professional football player, Detroit Lions

Notable faculty

Haps Benfer, theologian and athletic coach
Cecilia Conrad, academic and foundation administrator
Francesca Coppa, professor of women's and gender studies
William Dunham, mathematician
Margaret Garwood, music composer
Peyton R. Helm, former Muhlenberg College president (2003-2015)
Daniel Klem, ornithologist
J. Christopher Kovats-Bernat, anthropologist
Ludwig Lenel, composer and organist
Robert J. Marshall, Lutheran church leader
Frederick Augustus Muhlenberg, former president, Muhlenberg College (1867-1876)
Harry Hess Reichard, Pennsylvania German language scholar
George Rickey, sculptor
Len Roberts, poet
Theodore Schick, philosopher
Ben Schwartzwalder, former head football coach, Syracuse University
Helen Walker-Hill, musicologist
John Williams, former Muhlenberg College president (2015-2019)

Athletic administrators and coaches

George Barclay, football coach (1907)
Haps Benfer, football, basketball, and baseball coach (1925-1965)
Sam Bishop, men's soccer coach (2007-08)
Bennie Borgmann, men's basketball coach (1949-1954)
Alfred E. Bull, football coach (1903-07)
Doggie Julian, football coach (1936-1944) and baseball coach (1942-1944)
Thomas Kelley, football coach (1911-13) and men's basketball coach (1912-1914)
Bob Macaluso, baseball coach (1999-2006)
George McCaa, football coach (1914-1915), men's basketball coach (1914-1917), and baseball coach (1914-1915)
Nate Milne, football coach (2015 to present)
Steve Moore, men's basketball coach (1981-87)
John B. Price, football and baseball coach (1916-1917)
Larry Rosati, football coach (1945)
Johnny Spiegel, football coach (1921-22)
John Troxell, football coach (1997-2000)
John Utz, football coach (1934-35), men's basketball coach (1933-36), and baseball coach (1934-35)
Walter W. Wood, football, men's basketball, and baseball coach (1923-24)

References

Lists of people by university or college in Pennsylvania
Muhlenberg College